Johan Bergdahl (born 29 September 1962) is a Swedish fencer. He competed in the team épée event at the 1988 Summer Olympics.

References

External links
 

1962 births
Living people
Swedish male épée fencers
Olympic fencers of Sweden
Fencers at the 1988 Summer Olympics
Sportspeople from Jönköping
20th-century Swedish people